Rola Bahnam or often spelt Rula Bahnam, is a Lebanese TV presenter of an Iraqi descent. She is mostly known for working in Future TV and now presenting the TV Show "Isma Wi Naseeb" "Perfect Bride" on LBC. Rola was born to an Iraqi father and Lebanese mother, and in a recent interview with Shada Hassoun, she stated she was from Mosul.

Career 
Bahnam worked as a model and participated once with the Lebanese girl band, The 4 Cats in their first song, "Aachra, Hdaach, Tnaach", after which she left the team in 1998..
She began her career in 1998 on Future TV through "Elite Model Look", a Tv program for discovering fashion models and represented more like "Open Night" with Rima Karaki and Rima Maktabi, then "Fashion", after which "Rola On Air", and "Song Number One" in 2004.
After a long absence from television, she returned with the TV program "Qisma W Naseeb" and hosted its first season on the screen of LBC in 2007 then "Design Magazine" program specialized in the world of architecture and designs on the Abu Dhabi Channel in 2010.

References

Living people
Year of birth missing (living people)
Iraqi television personalities
Iraqi television presenters
Lebanese television presenters
Lebanese women television presenters
Iraqi women television presenters
Lebanese people of Arab descent
People from Mosul
Lebanese people of Iraqi descent
Naturalised citizens of the United Kingdom